Lucas is a Latin male given name (from the verb "lucere" - "to shine"), from which the English name Luke comes.

Persons with the name

In arts and entertainment
Lucas Bryant (born 1978), Canadian-American actor
Lucas Cranach the Elder (1472–1553), German painter 
Lucas Cranach the Younger (1515–1586), German Renaissance painter
Lucas Cruikshank (born 1993), American internet celebrity
Lucas Grabeel (born 1984), American actor
Lucas Hedges (born 1996), American actor 
Lucas Jade Zumann (born 2000), American actor
Lucas Lira, Brazilian YouTuber, entrepreneur and influencer
Lucas Secon (born 1970), Danish-American rapper
Lucas Till (born 1990), American actor
Lucas Wong (born 1999), Hong Kong rapper, singer and model

In politics, government, and religion
Lucas, Archbishop of Esztergom (c. 1120–1181), Hungarian prelate and diplomat
Lucas Atkinson (born 1981), American politician
Lucas Bersamin (born 1949), Filipino judge
Lucas Bolsius (born 1958), Dutch historian and politician
Lucas Hartong (born 1963), Dutch politician
Lucas Papademos (born 1947), Greek bank official and prime minister
Lucas Samalenge (1928–1961), Congolese and Katangese politician

In sport

In association football
Lucas Arzán (born 1999), Puerto Rican football player
Lucas Biglia (born 1986), Argentine currently playing for Milan
Lucas Cavallini (born 1992), Canadian currently playing for Vancouver Whitecaps
Lucas Hernandez (born 1996), French currently playing for Bayern Munich
Lucas Leiva (born 1987), Brazilian currently playing for Lazio
Lucas Licht (born 1981), Argentine-Israeli currently playing for Gimnasia La Plata	
Lucas Lobos (born 1981), Argentine, played for Tigres UANL
Lucas Moura (born 1992), Brazilian currently playing for Tottenham Hotspur
Lucas Neill (born 1978), Australian, played for Galatasaray and Blackburn Rovers  
Lucas Paquetá (born 1997), Brazilian currently playing for West Ham United
Lucas Pérez (born 1988), Spanish currently playing for Alavés
Lucas Piazon (born 1994), Brazilian currently playing for Rio Ave
Lucas Radebe (born 1969), South African, played for Leeds United and Kaizer Chiefs
Lucas Rios Marques (born 1988), Brazilian currently playing for Figueirense
Lucas Rougeaux (born 1994), French currently playing for OGC Nice
Lucas Salinas (born 1995), Brazilian football player
Lucas Severino (born 1979), Brazilian, played for FC Tokyo
Lucas Silva, several people
Lucas Torreira (born 1996), Uruguayan currently playing for Arsenal
Lucas Torró (born 1994), Spanish currently playing for Eintracht Frankfurt
Lucas Vázquez (born 1991), Spanish currently playing for Real Madrid
Lucas Zelarayán (born 1992), Argentine currently playing for Columbus Crew
Lucas Zen (born 1991), Brazilian currently playing for Botafogo
Jefferson Lucas Azevedo dos Santos (born 1984), Brazilian football player

In basketball
Lucas Dias (born 1995), Brazilian player
Lucas Mariano (born 1993), Brazilian player
Lucas Mondelo (born 1967), Spanish coach
Lucas Nogueira (born 1992), Brazilian player
Lucas Tohătan (born 1999), Romanian player

In other sports
Lucas Glover (born 1979), American professional golfer
Lucas González Amorosino (born 1985), Argentine rugby player
Lucas di Grassi (born 1984), Brazilian racing car driver
Lucas Krull (born 1998), American football player
Lucas Martins (born 1988), Brazilian mixed martial artist
Lucas Matthysse (born 1982), Argentine boxer
Lucas Miedler (born 1996), Austrian tennis player
Lucas Niang (born 1998), American football player
Lucas Patrick (born 1993), American football player
Lucas Raymond (born 2002), Swedish ice hockey player
Lucas Saatkamp (born 1986), Brazilian volleyball player; generally known as "Lucas" or "Lucão"
Lucas Vita (born 1985), Brazilian water polo player

Fictional characters with the name
Lucas (Mother 3), main character of the 2006 video game Mother 3
Lucas (Pokémon), male protagonist of the games Pokémon Diamond and Pearl
Lucas Fitzgerald, character in the Network Ten soap opera Neighbours
Lucas Goodwin, character in Netflix series House of Cards
Lucas Gottesman, a character in Pretty Little Liars
Lucas Hay, character in Channel 4 soap opera Hollyoaks
Lucas Hellinger, character in the television series FlashForward
Lucas Holden, character in the soap opera Home and Away
Lucas Jackson, name of Paul Newman's character in Cool Hand Luke
Lucas Johnson, character in the BBC soap opera EastEnders 
Lucas Kane, main character in the Fahrenheit video game
Lucas Kendell, a character from the television series Power Rangers Time Force.
Lucas Lee, teenage character in Scott Pilgrim vs. the World
Lucas McCain, name of character played by Chuck Connors in The Rifleman TV series
Lucas North, one of the main characters of the television series Spooks
Lucas Roberts, character on the NBC soap opera Days of our Lives
Lucas Scott, teen character on One Tree Hill
Lucas Sinclair is a main character on "Stranger Things"
Lucas Trent, Midnighter's secret identity
Lucas Valieri, a character in Degrassi: The Next Generation
Lucas Wolenczak, teenage character on SeaQuest DSV
 Lucas, character from Minecraft Story Mode
 Lucas, a character from the video game A Plague Tale: Innocence and its sequel A Plague Tale: Requiem

See also
Luca (given name)
Luka (given name)
Lukas
Loukas

Masculine given names
English masculine given names
French masculine given names
Spanish masculine given names